Tom Nijssen and Cyril Suk won in the final 6–4, 6–4, against Alex O'Brien and Jonathan Stark.

Seeds

  Grant Connell /  Patrick Galbraith (quarterfinals)
  Patrick McEnroe /  Richey Reneberg (quarterfinals)
  Tom Nijssen /  Cyril Suk (champions)
  Wayne Ferreira /  Danie Visser (first round)

Draw

Draw

External links
 ITF tournament edition details

Doubles